Nemapogon fuscalbella is a moth of the family Tineidae. It is found in France.

References

Moths described in 1908
Nemapogoninae